Joseph Rudolph Grimes (October 31, 1923 – September 7, 2007) was a leading twentieth century Liberian and African statesman. A trained lawyer, he served as Secretary of State from 1960 to 1972.

Early life
Grimes was born on October 31, 1923, to Louis Arthur Grimes and Victoria Grimes. He was educated at the College of West Africa (now Methodist University of Liberia) before graduating from Liberia College (now University of Liberia) with a Bachelor of Arts degree. Grimes then attended Harvard Law School in the United States where he earned a law degree, followed by a master's degree from Columbia University in New York City in international affairs.

Career
Following his education in America, he returned to Liberia where he founded the Louis Arthur Grimes School of Law at the now University of Liberia. Named after his father, the younger Grimes served as the first dean starting in 1951.

In 1958, he was appointed as the Acting Secretary of State of Liberia. In 1960, he was appointed Secretary of State (foreign minister) by President William Tubman. Serving until 1971, he is the longest serving foreign minister in Liberian history. He was preceded by Momolu Dukuly and was succeeded by Rocheforte Lafayette Weeks.

Later years
He was elected in 1975 to membership in the Commission of the Churches on International Affairs of the World Council of Churches (CCIA/WCC) and served as its Vice-Moderator until 1983. He was engaged as its Special advisor on African Affairs and representative to the United Nations in New York in 1993–1994.

Joseph Rudolph Grimes died on September 7, 2007, at his home in Guttenberg, New Jersey, at the age of 83.

Family 
Married to Doris.

References 

1923 births
2007 deaths
Harvard Law School alumni
School of International and Public Affairs, Columbia University alumni
Foreign Ministers of Liberia
University of Liberia alumni
People from Guttenberg, New Jersey
Grand Crosses with Star and Sash of the Order of Merit of the Federal Republic of Germany
Americo-Liberian people
College of West Africa alumni
Liberian expatriates in the United States